The 2018 iHeartRadio MMVAs were held on August 26, 2018 outside 299 Queen Street West in Toronto, Ontario, Canada. Unlike previous years, the 2018 show aired live at the end of August instead of Father's Day. It was hosted by Awkwafina.

Performances 

Loud Luxury served as DJ for the show.

Presenters 
 Tyra Banks – presented Best Collaboration
 Sonequa Martin-Green – introduced Halsey
 Prince Michael Jackson – introduced Bülow
 Tyler Shaw – presented Song of the Summer
 Derek Hough – presented Best EDM/Dance Artist or Group
 New City – introduced Alessia Cara
 Chrissy Metz – introduced 98 Degrees
 Ashlee Simpson and Evan Ross – presented Best Pop Artist or Group
 The Reklaws – introduced Kris Wu
 JWoww and Kristin Cavallari – introduced 5 Seconds of Summer
 Sofi Tukker – presented Fan Fave Video and Fan Fave Artist
 Gus Kenworthy and Madison Beer – introduced Marshmello and Anne-Marie
 Scott Helman and Francesco Yates – presented Artist of the Year
 Jus Reign and Craig McMorris – introduced The Beaches
 Alexandra Shipp and Colton Haynes – presented Video of the Year

Source:

Winners and nominees 
Nominees were announced on August 1, 2018. For the nominations, most awards categories were changed from being video-oriented to artist-oriented. Two new categories were also introduced: Song of the Summer and Best Collaboration. Shawn Mendes has the most nominations with eight, with Drake behind at seven. Winners were announced on August 26, 2018.

Video of the Year
Logic (featuring Alessia Cara and Khalid) – "1-800-273-8255"
 Shawn Mendes — "In My Blood"
 Halsey — "Bad at Love"
 Drake — "God's Plan"
 Childish Gambino — "This Is America"
 Ariana Grande — "No Tears Left to Cry"

Best EDM/Dance Artist or Group
Marshmello  
 Sofi Tukker
 Loud Luxury
 Calvin Harris
 Zedd
 Kygo

Best Director
Drake — "God's Plan" (Director: Karena Evans)
 Shawn Mendes — "In My Blood" (Director: Jay Martin)
 Drake — "Nice for What" (Director: Karena Evans)
 Childish Gambino — "This Is America" (Director: Hiro Murai)
 Justin Timberlake (featuring Chris Stapleton) — "Say Something" (Director: Arturo Perez Jr.)
 The Carters — "Apeshit" (Director: Ricky Saix)

Best Pop Artist or Group
Shawn Mendes
 Meghan Trainor
 Halsey
 Alessia Cara
 Ed Sheeran
 Camila Cabello

Best Rock/Alternative Artist or Group
Imagine Dragons
 Chvrches
 Portugal. The Man
 Foo Fighters
 Arcade Fire
 Arkells

Best Hip Hop Artist or Group
Drake
 The Carters
 Post Malone
 Cardi B
 Kendrick Lamar
 Childish Gambino

Best New Canadian Artist
Elijah Woods x Jamie Fine
 The Beaches
 Ralph
 New City
 Bülow
 Johnny Orlando

Artist of the Year
Shawn Mendes
 Ed Sheeran
 Cardi B
 Drake
 Camila Cabello
 Post Malone

Song of the Summer
Loud Luxury (featuring Brando) — "Body"
 Drake — "Nice for What"
 Cardi B, Bad Bunny and J Balvin — "I Like It"
 Zedd, Maren Morris and Grey — "The Middle"
 Marshmello and Anne-Marie — "Friends"
 Bebe Rexha (featuring Florida Georgia Line) — "Meant to Be"

Best Collaboration
 Kendrick Lamar (featuring SZA) — "All the Stars"
 Shawn Mendes (featuring Khalid) — "Youth"
 The Weeknd and Kendrick Lamar — "Pray for Me"
 Bebe Rexha (featuring Florida Georgia Line — "Meant to Be"
 Zedd, Maren Morris and Grey — "The Middle"
 Marshmello and Anne-Marie — "Friends"

Fan Fave Video
Shawn Mendes — "In My Blood"
 Drake — "God's Plan"
 Childish Gambino — "This Is America"
 The Carters — "Apeshit"
 Logic (featuring Alessia Cara and Khalid) – "1-800-273-8255"
 Alessia Cara – "Growing Pains"

Fan Fave Artist
Shawn Mendes
 Ed Sheeran
 Taylor Swift
 Camila Cabello
 Halsey
 Alessia Cara

Fan Fave Duo or Group
BTS
 Imagine Dragons
 Maroon 5
 Sofi Tukker
 The Chainsmokers
 5 Seconds of Summer

Fan Fave Single
Selena Gomez and Marshmello — "Wolves"
 Ariana Grande — "No Tears Left to Cry"
 Post Malone (featuring 21 Savage) — "Rockstar"
 Shawn Mendes — "In My Blood"
 Camila Cabello — "Havana"
 Ed Sheeran — "Perfect"

Fan Fave New Artist
Kris Wu
 Hayley Kiyoko
 Cardi B
 Billie Eilish
 Why Don't We
 Dua Lipa

Fan Fave Much Creator
TheDanocracy (Dan Rodo)
 The Baker Twins (Shannon Baker and Shauna Baker)
 The Mike On Much Podcast (Mike Veerman, Max Kerman and Shane Cunningham)
 SneakerTalk (Christian Cantelon)
 Jaclyn Forbes
 Candage Leca

Notes

 A Marshmello shocks MMVAs crowd by revealing is Shawn Mendes.

References

External links 

MuchMusic Video Awards
Much Music
2018 in Canadian music
2018 in Canadian television